Andrew Shelton may refer to:

Skeeter Shelton, Andrew Kemper "Skeeter" Shelton, baseball player
Andy Shelton, Andrew Marc "Andy" Shelton

See also
Andrew Sheldon (disambiguation)